Canan Öztoprak (born 1955) is a Turkish Republic of Northern Cyprus Cabinet Minister appointed in the April 2005 TRNC Government of Prime Minister Ferdi Sabit Soyer.  Her portfolios were National Education and Culture.She has been an active peace activist and founding member of the Cyprus Conflict Resolution Trainers Group. A psychologist, she graduated from Middle East Technical University in 1974.

References

Living people
Government ministers of Northern Cyprus
Cyprus Conflict Resolution Trainers Group
1955 births
Women government ministers of Northern Cyprus